Coonawarra is a small town north of Penola in South Australia. It is best known for the Coonawarra wine region named after it.

The Aboriginal Australians living in the area when Europeans arrived were the Bindjali people, The word coonawarra is reported to have been their word for honeysuckle, although this meaning has also been ascribed to Penola by the same source. An alternative origin to the name is still rooted in the local indigenous language: “The name of John Riddock’s fruit colony, started by him in 1895. “Coon” being the aboriginal word for “big lip”, and “warra,” for “house,” and was applied by natives to a house in the locality in which a man with a remarkably big lip lived”

Coonawarra was a station on the Mount Gambier railway line, which opened in 1887 and operated until it closed to freight on 12 April 1995. The Limestone Coast Railway tourist trains stopped at the station from Mount Gambier until 20 March 1999.

The township of Coonawarra is a few hundred metres west of the Riddoch Highway which passes along the ridge in the middle of the Coonawarra wine region. The historic Wynn's Coonawarra Winery in Memorial Drive is listed on the South Australian Heritage Register.

Population
In the 2016 Australian census, there were 137 people in Coonawarra. 84.9% of people were born in Australia and 89.9% of people spoke only English at home.

References

Towns in South Australia
Limestone Coast